Doina Bumbea (25 January 1950 – January 1997) was a Romanian painter who was abducted to North Korea in 1978. Born in Bucharest, Bumbea left Romania in 1970 and went to Italy, where she studied fine arts and became a painter. There, she would be contacted by a certain individual who promised her a job as gallery curator in Japan if she gave an art exhibition in Pyongyang, North Korea. Bumbea accepted and was taken there, but she would not be allowed to leave the country.

It has been reported that Bumbea was kidnapped along with other foreign women to obtain wives for American defectors in North Korea and prevent them from marrying ethnic Koreans and having mixed children with them. Thus, Bumbea was forcibly married to James Joseph Dresnok, with whom she had two sons. Bumbea died in 1997 of lung cancer in Pyongyang. Later, her brother Gabriel founded an NGO in her honor and tried to contact his nephews in North Korea. The Ministry of Foreign Affairs of Romania and several Romanian officials have been made aware, but no significant response has been given in the case.

Biography
Doina Bumbea was born on 25 January 1950 in Bucharest, Romania. She had two brothers, one of them being Gabriel Bumbea. The other one died in 2014. Her father died in 1989, but as of 2014, her mother was still alive.

In 1970, Bumbea left Romania and went to Rome, in Italy, where she lived in marriage with an Italian citizen for 2 years. Bumbea would later study fine arts and became a painter. In 1978, she met an Italian who was supposedly an art dealer who promised her a job as a gallery curator in Tokyo, Japan, if she made an art exhibition in Pyongyang, North Korea, first. She accepted this and was sent to North Korea, from where she would not be allowed to escape.

According to Charles Robert Jenkins, an American defector in North Korea, this country reportedly kidnapped Bumbea and other foreign women for a "spouse-sourcing" program for American defectors in North Korea, as the birth of ethnically mixed Koreans went against the wishes of the state, but also to obtain a number of ethnically non-Korean agents for the country. Therefore, Bumbea was forcibly married in the early 1980s to the American defector James Joseph Dresnok by the North Korean authorities. She had two children with Dresnok, Theodore Ricardo Dresnok, born in December 1981; and James Gabriel Dresnok, born in February 1983. Bumbea died from lung cancer in January 1997 in Pyongyang, isolated from the outer world. Her husband died in 2016, while her two children would become soldiers in the North Korean army.

In the years following her death, in 2008, Bumbea's brother Gabriel founded the Doina Bumbea Association, a Romanian NGO dealing with missing persons and their search and rescue. In 2014, he would attend a meeting of the United Nations Human Rights Council in Geneva, Switzerland, representing this association. On this meeting, the situation of the North Korean abductees was discussed. He would also attempt to meet or contact with his nephews, although unsuccessfully. Gabriel has created a page in honor of Bumbea on Facebook.

The Ministry of Foreign Affairs of Romania is aware of Bumbea's case. In fact, it has met with Gabriel to talk about it. However, it has only made some statements but has not talked much more about the subject. Gabriel has also met with former Romanian presidents Ion Iliescu and Traian Băsescu, but also with senator Dan Horațiu Buzatu and MEP Marian-Jean Marinescu, all in relation to Doina Bumbea.

See also
 List of kidnappings
 List of solved missing person cases

References

External links
 . Page created in Bumbea's honor by her living brother Gabriel.

1950 births
1970s missing person cases
1997 deaths
20th-century Romanian women artists
Artists from Bucharest
Deaths from lung cancer
Formerly missing people
Human rights abuses in North Korea
Kidnapped Romanian people
Missing person cases in Romania
North Korean abductions
North Korean people of Romanian descent
North Korea–Romania relations
Romanian emigrants to Italy
Romanian women painters
Deaths from cancer in North Korea